Amazonian may refer to:
Amazonian (Mars), a geologic system and time period on the planet Mars
Amazon River, in South America
Amazon basin, that river's drainage basin
Amazon rainforest, rainforest covering most of the Amazon Basin
Relating to the Amazons, female warrior tribe in Greek mythology
Amazonian, an employee of the company Amazon.com
Amazonian, a fictional species in the Futurama episode "Amazon Women in the Mood"
Amazonians, people who live in the Amazon basin
Indigenous peoples in Brazil

See also
Amazon (disambiguation)